Apion rufirostre is a species of seed weevils native to Europe.

References

External links
Images representing Apion at BOLD

Brentidae
Beetles described in 1775
Beetles of Europe
Taxa named by Johan Christian Fabricius